Generally, security modes refer to information systems security modes of operations used in mandatory access control (MAC) systems.  Often, these systems contain information at various levels of security classification.  The mode of operation is determined by:
  The type of users who will be directly or indirectly accessing the system.
  The type of data, including classification levels, compartments, and categories, that are processed on the system.
  The type of levels of users, their need to know, and formal access approvals that the users will have.

Dedicated security mode
In this mode of operation, all users must have:
 Signed NDA for ALL information on the system.
 Proper clearance for ALL information on the system.
 Formal access approval for ALL information on the system.
 A valid need to know for ALL information on the system.
All users can access ALL data.

System high security mode
In system high mode of operation, all users must have:
 Signed NDA for ALL information on the system.
 Proper clearance for ALL information on the system.
 Formal access approval for ALL information on the system.
 A valid need to know for SOME information on the system.
All users can access SOME data, based on their need to know.

Compartmented security mode
In this mode of operation, all users must have:
 Signed NDA for ALL information on the system.
 Proper clearance for ALL information on the system.
 Formal access approval for SOME information they will access on the system.
 A valid need to know for SOME information on the system.
All users can access SOME data, based on their need to know and formal access approval.

Multilevel security mode
In multilevel security mode of operation (also called Controlled Security Mode), all users must have:
 Signed NDA for ALL information on the system.
 Proper clearance for SOME information on the system.
 Formal access approval for SOME information on the system.
 A valid need to know for SOME information on the system.
All users can access SOME data, based on their need to know, clearance and formal access approval

Summary

See also
 Access control
 Multifactor authentication
 Bell–LaPadula model
 Biba model
 Clark-Wilson model 
 Discretionary access control (DAC)
 Graham-Denning model
 Multilevel security (MLS)
 Mandatory access control (MAC)
 Security
 Security engineering
 Take-grant model

References
Krutz, Ronald L. and Vines, Russell Dean, The CISSP Prep Guide; Gold Edition, Wiley Publishing, Inc., Indianapolis, Indiana, 2003.

External links
 DoD 5200.28 defines the security terms 

Computer security models